Frank Hedley Putnam (August 23, 1881 – October 10, 1959) was a Canadian politician. He served in the Legislative Assembly of British Columbia from 1933 to 1949 from the electoral district of Nelson-Creston, a member of the Coalition government, previously a member of the Liberal part from 1933 to 1941.

References

1881 births
1959 deaths